Francisco Ibáñez de Segovia y Peralta (1644–1712) was a Spanish colonial administrator who was Royal Governor of Chile from 1700 to 1709.  He was born in Madrid and died in Lima.

Sources

1644 births
1712 deaths
Military personnel from Madrid
Royal Governors of Chile
Spanish generals
Spanish military personnel